Juan Carlos Balaguer Zamora (born 6 May 1966) is a Spanish retired footballer who played as a goalkeeper.

Club career
Born in Valencia, Balaguer emerged through local Valencia CF's youth system, but only appeared for its B-team as a senior. In 1990 he signed for Albacete Balompié, contributing with two games in his first season as the club got promoted to La Liga for the first time ever.

Balaguer made his debut in the top division on 22 March 1992, in a 2–0 away win against Sporting de Gijón. He eventually became the starter over Costa Rican Luis Gabelo Conejo, but returned to the substitutes bench after the arrival of José Francisco Molina in the 1994 summer.

From 1996 until his retirement, four years later, Balaguer competed in Segunda División and Segunda División B, representing CP Mérida, Levante UD, Real Murcia and Talavera CF. He later worked as a goalkeeper coach, with Albacete, CD Castellón, Villarreal CF and Hércules CF.

References

External links

1966 births
Living people
Spanish footballers
Footballers from Valencia (city)
Association football goalkeepers
La Liga players
Segunda División players
Segunda División B players
Tercera División players
Valencia CF Mestalla footballers
Albacete Balompié players
CP Mérida footballers
Levante UD footballers
Real Murcia players
Talavera CF players